Eräjärvi is a former municipality of Finland.
Independent municipality until 1973. After 1973 part of Orivesi city (population ca. 9,000).
Distance to Orivesi 20 km, Tampere 50 km
Villages: Uiherla, Vihasjärvi, Haapaniemi, Hietalahti, Järvenpää, Kauppila, Vedentausta, Hirtolahti, Kuivanen, Koppala, Leväslahti
Church built 1821, part of Orivesi parish

Organisations and non-governmental organisations active in Eräjärvi:
The Development Organisation of Eräjärvi village (Eräjärven Kehittämisyhdistys ry), registered in 1991
Eräjärvi Sports Club (Eräjärven Urheilijat ry): Sport activities, Erälinna building and Rönni entertainment centre
Eräjärven Työväen Näyttämö. Rönni Summer theatre and Eräjärvi tupa theatre
Water organisation of Eräjärvi region – building and connecting households to waterline
Eräjärvi association: Collecting historical memorandum from Eräjärvi, Stone and mineral museum
Leväslahti small farmers association – Collecting historical memorandum, village hall
Järvenpää-Vihasjärvi village association – market, trips, village activities
Eräjärvi schools parents association – Taking care of school children's interest
Circus Supiainen – local circus group for children
Finnish Red Cross –Eräjärvi jaosto – First aid groups for children, fund raising

References

Populated places disestablished in 1973
Former municipalities of Finland
Orivesi